The 1929 World Table Tennis Championships mixed doubles was the third edition of the mixed doubles championship.  

István Kelen and Anna Sipos defeated Laszlo Bellak and Magda Gál in the final by three sets to one.

Results

See also
List of World Table Tennis Championships medalists

References

-
Mixed doubles table tennis